Lalke is a village in Hafizabad District, Punjab, Pakistan. The complete name of this village is Lalke Dhiranke Tarar. It is located at 31° 48' 46N 73° 50' 19E and lies to the north of Hafizabad some 11 km away.

References

Villages in Hafizabad District
Hafizabad District